Etty, Ettie or Etti is a feminine given name, often a short version of Esther or Elizabeth. It is also a surname. It may refer to the following people:

Given name
 Etti Ankri (born 1963), Israeli singer-songwriter
 Etty Darwin (1843[–1927), editor for her father Charles Darwin
 Etty Fraser (born 1931), Brazilian actress
 Etty Glazer, kidnapped South African woman
 Ettie Mae Greene (1877–1992), an American supercentenarian
 Ettie Grenfell, Baroness Desborough (1867–1952), British society hostess
 Etty Hillesum (1914–1943), Dutch diarist
 Etty Lau Farrell (born 1974), American rock singer
 Etti Plesch (1914–2003), Austrian countess, Hungarian countess, huntress, racehorse owner and socialite
 Ettie Rout (1877–1936), Tasmanian-born New Zealander noted for fighting sexually transmitted diseases among World War I soldiers
 Ettie Steinberg (1914–1942), one of the few Jewish Irish Holocaust victims
 Etty Tantri (born 1975), Indonesian badminton player

Surname
 Eda-Ines Etti (born 1981), Estonian singer 
 John Etty (born 1927), English rugby league footballer
 William Etty (1787–1849), English painter
 William Etty (architect) (c. 1675–1734), English architect and craftsman

See also
 Etty Bay, in Queensland, Australia

Feminine given names
Hypocorisms